Homa Mirafshar (born May 24, 1946) is a prominent Iranian poet and songwriter based in the United States.

She is considered the best Persian lyricist regarding to Iranian Pop and Traditional Music producers, singers and writers.

Iranian musicians such as Manuchehr Cheshmazar and Mohammad Heydari have said that Homa's poems integrate well with rhythm and melody. Audiences recognise these signature elements in her work.

Childhood and Family 
Mirafshar was born in Tehran to the artistic Homayoun family. Homa calls her father her main motivator for her later achievements. She started composing poetry as a child in elementary school. She married Ali MirAfshara, the cousin of Iranian singer Homeyra, and Homa and Homeyra have collaborated on songs. Mirafshar has two children, Keyvan and Katayoun.

Persian Golden Lioness Awards 
The World Academy of Arts, Literature, and Media - WAALM AWARDS OF 2006 - Best Lyricist

References

External links
https://www.youtube.com/watch?v=Szm4UAOnscY
https://www.youtube.com/watch?v=JT6ZpKM0WTs
https://www.youtube.com/watch?v=4iV9AeIOUk8 WAALM Awards 2006 Homa Mirafshar

Iranian-American culture
1946 births
Living people